Quentin Lecoeuche (born 4 February 1994) is a French professional footballer who plays as a left back for Valenciennes.

Club career
Lecoeuche is a youth exponent from RC Lens. He made his Ligue 1 debut on 26 April 2015 against AS Monaco replacing Wylan Cyprien after 74 minutes in a 3–0 home defeat.

After Luçon's bankruptcy, he signed a two-year contract with FC Lorient on 4 August 2016 to play with the B team.

On 17 July 2020, Lecoeuche joined AC Ajaccio on a season-long loan deal.

On 1 September 2021, he joined Valenciennes on a two-year contract.

References

External links

1994 births
Living people
Association football midfielders
French footballers
Ligue 1 players
Ligue 2 players
RC Lens players
FC Lorient players
US Orléans players
AC Ajaccio players
Valenciennes FC players